Manadath Mohammed Pillay Abdul Khader (27 February 1925 – 10 August 1993) was an Indian lawyer, jurist, and politician who served as the Advocate General of Kerala from 1969 to 1979.

Early life and career 
Abdul Khader was born on 27 February 1925 in Aluva to M. K. Mohammed Pillay, the younger brother of prominent industrialist and philanthropist, M. K. Mackar Pillay.

In 1952, Khader was elected to the Legislative Assembly of the newly formed state of Travancore-Cochin from the Aluva constituency, defeating future Kerala Pradesh Congress Committee president T. O. Bava. Khader lost re-election in 1954 to the same opponent.

Khader's brother, M. M. Pareed Pillay went on to become the Chief Justice of Kerala and the first chairman of the Kerala State Human Rights Commission.

Electoral history

1952 Travancore-Cochin Legislative Assembly election

1954 Travancore-Cochin Legislative Assembly election

References 

Advocates General for Indian states
20th-century Indian lawyers
Travancore–Cochin MLAs 1954–1956
People from Aluva
Manadath family
1925 births
1993 deaths
20th-century Indian Muslims